Labadi Beach or more properly known as La Pleasure Beach is the busiest beach on Ghana's coast. It is one of Accra's beaches and is maintained by the local hotels. Labadi Beach is in a town called La, popularly known as Labadi, near Teshie in the Greater Accra Region of Ghana. An entrance fee to those not staying in the hotels is charged. On holidays and weekends there are often performances of reggae, hiplife, playback, and cultural drumming and dancing. As of 2014, the beach is still under intense scrutiny from the community to alleviate the ongoing issue of open defecation present on the beach . Proposals to build additional designated sanitation facilities to accommodate the issue have been brought to the attention of the local council and hotels near the beach. Aside from visiting the beach to have fun, people visit the place early morning to work out, mostly on weekends.

References

External links
 Photographs of Labadi Beach, April 2016
 Ultimate guide here Labadi Beach Hotel Accra

Accra
Beaches of Ghana